Cuverville is a commune in the Seine-Maritime department in the Normandy region in northern France.

Geography

Population

Places of interest
 The church of Notre-Dame, dating from the sixteenth century.
 An eighteenth century chateau.
 Remains of a feudal castle.

Notable people
 André Gide is buried here.

See also
Communes of the Seine-Maritime department

References

Communes of Seine-Maritime